Willie James Clay (born September 5, 1970) is a former American football safety in the National Football League for the Detroit Lions, New England Patriots, and New Orleans Saints.

Clay attended Linsly High School in Wheeling, West Virginia where he earned twelve varsity letters playing football, basketball, and baseball.

While in college at Georgia Tech, he made 16 career interceptions to break the school record (formerly 14) and was part of the 1990 Georgia Tech Yellow Jackets football team that won the NCAA national championship.

He is a member of the New England Patriots 1990s All-Decade Team.

Clay is the nephew of Dwight Clay who was a basketball player for the University of Notre Dame. Dwight Clay was nicknamed "The Iceman" and is famous for hitting the game winning jump shot that ended UCLA's NCAA all-time record 88-game winning streak on January 19, 1974.

His nickname was "Big Play" Willie Clay and his interception against Jacksonville in the AFC Championship sent New England to its second Super Bowl in team history in 1997.

References

1970 births
Living people
American football cornerbacks
American football safeties
Detroit Lions players
Georgia Tech Yellow Jackets football players
New England Patriots players
New Orleans Saints players
Linsly School alumni
Players of American football from Pittsburgh